Mind Bokeh is a studio album by British electronic musician Bibio, released on Warp. It was released on 29 March 2011 in the United States and 4 April 2011 in the rest of the world. Bibio described the album as a "balance of the familiar and the non-familiar". The title comes from a Japanese word "Bokeh", which means the blurry, out-of-focus part of a photograph.

Critical reception
At Metacritic, which assigns a weighted average score out of 100 to reviews from mainstream critics, the album received an average score of 75% based on 21 reviews, indicating "generally favorable reviews".

Clash named it the 24th best album of 2011.

Track listing

Charts

References

External links
 

2011 albums
Bibio albums
Warp (record label) albums